Fabiana Gisela Vallejos (born 30 July 1985) is an Argentine footballer who plays for Boca Juniors as a midfielder.

International career
Vallejos became a member of the Argentine national team during a historic period for the team: She helped the team qualify for the 2003 FIFA Women's World Cup in the United States. It was the first time that Argentina reached the World Cup on the women's side.

She also participated at the 2003 Dominican Republic Pan American Games, the 2003 and the 2006 Sudamericano Femenino. She won the 2006 title with the Argentine team, defeating continental rivals Brazil for the first time ever.

Vallejos also played all three of Argentina's matches at the 2007 FIFA Women's World Cup in China.

International goals
Scores and results list Argentina's goal tally first

References

External links

1985 births
Living people
People from San Isidro, Buenos Aires
Argentine women's footballers
Women's association football midfielders
Club Atlético River Plate (women) players
Boca Juniors (women) footballers
Atlético Huila (women) players
Argentina women's international footballers
2003 FIFA Women's World Cup players
2007 FIFA Women's World Cup players
Footballers at the 2008 Summer Olympics
Olympic footballers of Argentina
Competitors at the 2014 South American Games
South American Games gold medalists for Argentina
South American Games medalists in football
Argentine expatriate women's footballers
Argentine expatriate sportspeople in Chile
Expatriate women's footballers in Chile
Argentine expatriate sportspeople in Spain
Expatriate women's footballers in Spain
Argentine expatriate sportspeople in Colombia
Expatriate women's footballers in Colombia
Sportspeople from Buenos Aires Province